State Route 330 (SR 330) is a state highway in the U.S. state of California, connecting  SR 210 in the city of San Bernardino with the San Bernardino National Forest and SR 18 at Running Springs. SR 330 is also known as City Creek Road in the San Bernardino Mountains.

Route description
At its southern terminus, SR 330 begins in San Bernardino at SR 210. It is a freeway for approximately a mile, then turns into a conventional two-lane highway. It runs northeasterly from the San Bernardino Valley into the mountains to Running Springs, where it ends at State Route 18. The entire route is in San Bernardino County.

It alternates between long, straight stretches and curved sections. There are three passing lanes, at the  level, the  level, and the  level.

SR 330 is part of the California Freeway and Expressway System, and the southernmost freeway portion is part of the National Highway System, a network of highways that are considered essential to the country's economy, defense, and mobility by the Federal Highway Administration. SR 330 is eligible to be included in the State Scenic Highway System, but it is not officially designated as a scenic highway by the California Department of Transportation.

History
SR 330 was originally a part of Legislative Route 207, defined in 1937. It was signed as SR 30 until 1972, when that route was redefined to continue south along former SR 106 rather than continue northeasterly along SR 330.  

Not including Interstate and U.S. highways, SR 330 was one of only three routes in California which is numbered based on the number of a current or former parent route (the others being SR 299 and SR 371). This relationship was lost once the remaining portions of former SR 30 were signed as SR 210.

In December 2010, a part of SR 330 was washed out, forcing the closure of the entire route for several months. Access to the route was restricted to local residents only. It was reopened in May 2011. Its closure was cited as a reason for low attendance at ski resorts for the year, as SR 330 links to the resorts.

Major intersections
All exits are unnumbered along the freeway segment of SR 330 between SR 210 and Highland Avenue.

See also

References

External links

California @ AARoads.com - State Route 330
Caltrans: Route 330 highway conditions
California Highways: SR 330

330
330
State Route 330